Stephen "Steve" Goldsmith (born December 12, 1946) is an American politician and writer who was the 46th mayor of Indianapolis. He also served as the deputy mayor of New York City for operations from 2010 to 2011. A member of the Republican Party, he ran unsuccessfully for lieutenant governor of Indiana in 1988 and governor of Indiana in 1996. He is currently the Derek Bok Professor of the Practice of Urban Policy   and Director of Data-Smart City Solutions at the John F. Kennedy School of Government at Harvard University. In 2006, Goldsmith was elected as a fellow of the National Academy of Public Administration.

Early life and career 
Goldsmith was born on December 12, 1946, in Indianapolis, Indiana. He is a graduate of Wabash College and the University of Michigan Law School where he earned a Juris Doctor degree. Goldsmith is an Eagle Scout, a recipient of the Distinguished Eagle Scout Award, and a member of Beta Theta Pi fraternity.

Political career

Marion County Prosecutor 
In 1978, Goldsmith began his political career by defeating Judge Andrew Jacobs Sr., a Democrat, in the race for Marion County Prosecutor. Goldsmith continued to serve in this capacity for 12 years (1979–1991), when the opportunity to run for Mayor of Indianapolis presented itself.

1988 lieutenant gubernatorial election 
In 1988, Lt. Gov. John Mutz made an unsuccessful bid for Governor of Indiana, calling upon Goldsmith to be his running mate. Mutz and Goldsmith lost to the Democratic ticket of Evan Bayh and Frank O'Bannon.

Mayor of Indianapolis 
In 1991, Goldsmith ran under the Republican banner for mayor, defeating his Democratic opponent Louis Mahern by a clear majority. Goldsmith served as mayor of Indianapolis for two terms from 1992 to 2000, being reelected in 1995.

1996 gubernatorial election 
Goldsmith was the Republican nominee for Governor of Indiana in 1996 against Lt. Gov. Frank O'Bannon. O'Bannon defeated Goldsmith 52% to 47%. Despite being mayor of Indianapolis, Goldsmith failed to win Marion County, which includes Indianapolis. O'Bannon overcame an early deficit in the polls by focusing on his long history of public service, his true Indiana roots, and the alleged mismanagement of the city of Indianapolis while Goldsmith was mayor. The Goldsmith campaign was unable to successfully rebut "allegations of influence peddling" and accusations that cuts in spending had undermined the city's ability to process sewage. "Polls also showed that his negative campaign ads were unpopular with voters."

Chief domestic policy advisor 
Goldsmith was chief domestic policy advisor to President George W. Bush in the 2000 campaign and then served as Special Advisor to President Bush on faith-based and not-for-profit initiatives. He was appointed chair of the board of directors for the Corporation for National and Community Service in 2001, a position he still holds.

Deputy Mayor of New York City 
On April 30, 2010, Mayor Michael Bloomberg of New York City announced he would appoint Goldsmith to become Deputy Mayor for Operations, a position he held until August 4, 2011. He had responsibility for the city's police, fire, sanitation, and buildings departments, among others, in his 14-month period of service.  Goldsmith was tasked by Bloomberg with advancing an innovation agenda in the city and his work led to enhancements to the city's use of technology, improvements in restaurant licensing, and faster processing of building permits. Goldsmith oversaw the launch of the 311 Service Request Map, the NYC Simplicity Idea Market employee crowdsourcing platform, and the Change By Us NYC community collaboration portal.  Goldsmith supervised the repair of the troubled CityTime employee timekeeping system  and initiated several public-private partnerships in the areas of energy, wastewater management, and parking. The New York Times suggested that his "short tenure was complicated by controversies, most notably after the city's slow response to a crippling snowstorm in December".

Just days before his resignation, Goldsmith was arrested after a domestic altercation with his wife and spent two nights in a Washington jail due to a mandatory arrest law. Charges were not filed and the Goldsmiths contested the police report. Mayor Bloomberg came under criticism for not disclosing the reason for the resignation. On January 4, 2012, a Washington Superior Court judge found that Goldsmith was, as a matter of law, "actually innocent", and that there was no assault during the argument between him and his wife.  A ruling of "actual innocence" requires the defendant to appear before a judge and demonstrate proof that the offense did not occur - a higher standard than showing a lack of evidence of crime.

Private sector 

Goldsmith was a partner of Knowledge Universe, which invests in Internet-oriented education companies, day care, and childhood learning companies, and B2B companies, principally in business and human resources consulting and online training.

He also was the chairman emeritus of the Manhattan Institute's (a policy research think tank) Center for Civic Innovation.

Electoral history

Publications 
In addition to contributing to publications such as the New York Times, Washington Times, Wall Street Journal, and Governing, Goldsmith has written several books on government including:
 The Responsive City, Jossey Bass, 2014.
 The Power of Social Innovation, Jossey Bass, 2010.
 Governing By Network: The New Shape of the Public Sector: Brookings Institution. 2004.
 Putting Faith In Neighborhoods: Making Cities Work Through Grassroots Citizenship: Hudson Institute. 2002.
 The Entrepreneurial City: A How-To Handbook for Urban Innovators. Editor, Manhattan Institute. 1999.
 The Twenty-First Century City Resurrecting Urban America: Regnery 1997

References

External links 

 Harvard School of Government Profile
 Data-Smart City Solutions
 Better, Faster, Cheaper with Stephen Goldsmith
 Manhattan Institute
 

|-

|-

|-

|-

|-

1946 births
20th-century American lawyers
20th-century American politicians
Deputy mayors of New York City
District attorneys in Indiana
Indiana Republicans
Harvard Kennedy School faculty
Living people
Mayors of Indianapolis
New York (state) Republicans
University of Michigan Law School alumni
Wabash College alumni